Frederica is a Regency romance novel by Georgette Heyer. The story is set in 1818. The plot is typical of several later Heyer romances in counterpointing the courtships of an older and a younger couple, with variation provided by the antics of Frederica's younger brothers and their boisterous mongrel.

Plot summary
A wealthy bachelor's affluent sisters, whom he dislikes, lobby him to give a ball at his own expense for their daughters' come-out. A distant cousin also asks him to introduce her attractive younger sister to the ton.  To the astonishment of all, he agrees to give the ball on condition that his encroaching sisters share it with their unknown cousins.  His sisters assume he must be under the spell of the beautiful younger cousin, whereas it is the seemingly unremarkable older cousin, encumbered with raising her three orphaned younger siblings and managing a neglectful older brother, who has caught his carefully concealed interest.

More plot detail
Frederica Merriville has long been in charge of her younger siblings. Since her parents' death, she has taken it upon herself to make sure that her beautiful sister Charis is well married, believing herself to be on the shelf (too old to be desirable in her social circles). To further this end, she brings the family from their country home to London and introduces herself to a distant relation, the selfish and indolent Marquis of Alverstoke, asking him to sponsor her sister into "the ton" during the subsequent Season.

The Marquis is initially reluctant but agrees to sponsor the Merriville ladies out of mischief, mostly to annoy his sister Louisa who had been demanding similar assistance to launch her own daughter into society. At their combined debut ball, Alverstoke's homely niece is easily outshone by Charis' beauty.

The Merrivilles are liked by everyone for their easy and engaging manners and good breeding. Charis is admired by many young men but she falls for the Marquis's slow-witted and handsome cousin Endymion Dauntry. Frederica also acquires her own share of admirers, including (to his own astonishment) Alverstoke himself.

Alverstoke is fascinated by her frank and open manners, unlike the society manners of London's fashionable ladies. He is also delighted by the high spirits of the two youngest Merrivilles, her brothers Felix and Jessamy, and comes to like them for their own sakes. He slowly but deeply falls in love with Frederica and is ready to do anything for her sake.

Characters
Vernon Dauntry, The Marquis of Alverstoke: an elegant, jaded nobleman
Frederica Merriville: a frank-spoken young woman, and de facto guardian of her three younger siblings while her younger brother Harry attends Oxford
Felix: Frederica's youngest brother
Jessamy: Frederica's younger brother
Charis: Frederica's beautiful sister
Harry Merriville: Frederica's younger brother and heir to the Merriville Estate
Miss Seraphina Winsham: maternal aunt and chaperone to Frederica and Charis
Lufra: Merriville family dog
Louisa, Lady Buxted: Alverstoke's demanding and selfish elder sister
Carlton, Lord Buxted: Lady Buxted's son and Frederica's suitor
Jane: Lady Buxted's daughter
Augusta, Lady Jevington: Alverstoke's arrogant elder sister
Gregory: Lady Jevington's son
Anna: Lady Jevington's daughter
Sally, Lady Jersey: friend of Alverstoke and “Queen of the Ton”
Mr. Darcy Moreton: Alverstoke's friend and an unsuccessful suitor to Frederica
Endymion Dauntry: Alverstoke's young cousin and heir, and Charis's suitor
Chloë: Endymion Dauntry's sister
Lady Elizabeth Kentmere: Alverstoke's understanding elder sister
Charles Trevor: Alverstoke's able and efficient secretary

Footnotes

References
Hodge, JA. The Private World of Georgette Heyer (Bodley Head; 1984)

1965 British novels
Novels by Georgette Heyer
Historical novels
Fiction set in 1818
The Bodley Head books
Regency romance novels